Ksar Chellala District is a district of Tiaret Province, Algeria.

Districts of Tiaret Province

fr:Ksar Chellala